Mulieris Towers are two skyscrapers located in the Puerto Madero neighborhood of Buenos Aires, Argentina; each tower rises 161 metres and has 45 floors.

Developed by Creaurban, a unit of the Macri Group, the two residential buildings were built on an area of 6,792 m² and completed in 2009, becoming the fourth-tallest buildings in Argentina. The project's name comes from the latin mulieris, meaning 'women'.

See also
List of tallest buildings in Argentina

References

External links

 

Buildings and structures in Buenos Aires
Residential buildings completed in 2009
Residential skyscrapers in Argentina
Twin towers